Torino Stura railway station serves the town and comune of Turin, in the Piedmont region, northwestern Italy. It is located on the Corso Romania.

Since 2012 it serves lines SFM1, SFM2 and SFM4, part of the Turin metropolitan railway service.

Services

References

Railway stations in Turin